Jay Perez (born September 23, 1963) is an American Tejano musician, who is known for his mixing of rhythm and blues with traditional Tejano music.

Career
Jay was born in San Antonio on September 21, 1963. He was raised by his mother, Janie Narranjo. He attended John Jay High School and dropped out his Junior year to work and provide for is brother and sister. Initially a drummer for Mysterio Band with Albert Castaneda, he then became a leading vocalist for Latin Breed and David Lee Garza y los Musicales. Perez began a solo career in the early 1990s and has released several solo albums. He has also won several Tejano Music Awards. To his fan base, he is known as "The Voice", and “El Hijo De San Antonio”.

Discography

 Breakin' The Rules (with The Latin Breed) 1989
 Con El Tiempo with (David Lee Garza Y Los Musicales) 1991
 13/92 (with David Lee Garza Y Los Musicales) 1992
 Te Llevo En Mi 1993
 Steel Rain 1994
 The Voice 1995
 No Limits 1996
 Toda Mi Vida 1998
 Siempre Contigo 1999
 Mi Estrella 2000
 Always & Forever 2000
 De Mi Cora-Soul 2001
 Hombre en la Luna 2002
 Mi Destino 2003
 Jay Perez Christmas 2004
 Live in Concert 2005
 All of Me 2006
 La Voz del 2008 2007
 All The Way Live 2009
 The Voice Of Authority 2011
 New Horizons 2012
 Anthology-Back in the Day 2013
 Un Amigo Tendras 2015
 Contigo-25th Anniversary 2019
 El Maestro 2021

DVD
Jay Perez Up Close and Personal 2005

Awards
 Tejano Music Award Male Vocalist of the Year 2008 
 Tejano Music Award Male Vocalist of the Year 2007 
 Tejano Music Award Male Vocalist of the Year 2006 
 Tejano Music Award Male Vocalist of the Year 2005 
 Tejano Music Award Male Vocalist of the Year 2004 
 Tejano Music Award Male Vocalist of the Year 2003 
 Tejano Music Award Male Vocalist of the Year 2000 
 Tejano Music Award Entertainer of the Year 2008 
 Tejano Music Award Male Vocalist of the Year 2010 
 Tejano Music Male Vocalist of the Decade Award (2000–2010) for 2010

References

External links
Official Jay Perez website

American male singers
Hispanic and Latino American musicians
Living people
Singers from Texas
American musicians of Mexican descent
Tejano musicians
Musicians from San Antonio
Latin music songwriters
1963 births